The v-pug (Chloroclystis v-ata) is a moth of the family Geometridae. It is found throughout the Palearctic region, the Near East and North Africa. It is well distributed in the British Isles except for the north of Scotland. The species was first described by Adrian Hardy Haworth in 1809.

The forewings of newly emerged adults are green with a characteristic V-shaped black mark which is part of a crossline. The green colouring fades over time but the markings, small size and triangular resting posture make this an easy species to identify. The hindwings are greyish white. Either one or two broods are produced each year and adults can be seen at any time between May and August. The species flies at night and is attracted to light.

The green larva, usually with three reddish stripes, feeds on the flowers of a wide range of plants (see list below). The species overwinters as a pupa.

Subspecies
Chloroclystis v-ata lucinda (Butler, 1879)
Chloroclystis v-ata relicta Krogerus, 1996

Recorded food plants
Achillea - yarrow
Angelica
Artemisia - mugwort
Clematis
Eupatorium
Ligustrum - privet
Lysimachia
Lythrum
Rubus
Sambucus - elder
Solidago - goldenrod

References

Chinery, Michael Collins Guide to the Insects of Britain and Western Europe 1986 (Reprinted 1991)
Skinner, Bernard Colour Identification Guide to Moths of the British Isles 1984

External links

V-pug at UKMoths
Lepiforum e.V.
De Vlinderstichting 

Chloroclystis
Moths described in 1809
Moths of Japan
Moths of Europe
Moths of Asia
Taxa named by Adrian Hardy Haworth